The Antonín Dvořák Theatre is an opera house in Ostrava, Czech Republic, which opened in 1907. Since 1919 it has been one of two permanent venues of the National Moravian Silesian Theatre.

History 

The Neo-baroque building of the theatre was designed by architect Alexander Graf. It was built by the Ostrava company Noe & Storch. The Antonín Dvořák Theatre was the first building in what is now the  Czech Republic to use reinforced concrete beams.

The interior was designed by sculptors of the company Johann Bock & Son . The sculptures decorating the facade were made by Eduard Smetana and Leopold Kosiga. Drama and Music, two reliefs in the main foyer of the theatre, were donated by academic sculptor Helena Scholzová (Helen Zelezny-Scholz).

The Antonín Dvořák Theatre was opened on 28 September 1907, as a German theatre. Up to 1919, the performances were solely in German. Following the World War I, the theatre passed to the hands of Czechoslovak state and became a stage of the National Moravian Silesian Theatre. From 1949, the theatre was renamed as the Zdeněk Nejedlý Theatre and in 1990 as the Antonín Dvořák Theatre.

External links 

 
 TACE – entry in  TACE database

Theatres in Ostrava
Buildings and structures in Ostrava
Music venues in the Czech Republic
Theatres completed in 1918
Music venues completed in 1918
Theatre